The 1998–99 NBA season was the Clippers' 29th season in the National Basketball Association, and their 15th season in Los Angeles. On March 23, 1998, the owners of all 29 NBA teams voted 27–2 to reopen the league's collective bargaining agreement, seeking changes to the league's salary cap system, and a ceiling on individual player salaries. The National Basketball Players Association (NBPA) opposed to the owners' plan, and wanted raises for players who earned the league's minimum salary. After both sides failed to reach an agreement, the owners called for a lockout, which began on July 1, 1998, putting a hold on all team trades, free agent signings and training camp workouts, and cancelling many NBA regular season and preseason games. Due to the lockout, the NBA All-Star Game, which was scheduled to be played in Philadelphia on February 14, 1999, was also cancelled. However, on January 6, 1999, NBA commissioner David Stern, and NBPA director Billy Hunter finally reached an agreement to end the lockout. The deal was approved by both the players and owners, and was signed on January 20, ending the lockout after 204 days. The regular season began on February 5, and was cut short to just 50 games instead of the regular 82-game schedule.

This was also the final season where the team played at the Los Angeles Memorial Sports Arena, and played occasional home games at the Arrowhead Pond in Anaheim. The Clippers won the Draft Lottery selecting Michael Olowokandi out of Pacific University with the first overall pick in the 1998 NBA draft, and signed free agents Sherman Douglas, and undrafted rookie forward Tyrone Nesby in the off-season. However, the Clippers still struggled under new head coach Chris Ford, losing their first 17 games of the season, tying the 1988–89 Miami Heat for the then-worst start in NBA history (later on broken by the 2009–10 New Jersey Nets, who lost their first 18 games of the season). At midseason, the team signed second-year guard Troy Hudson in March. The Clippers lost 30 of their first 33 games, then lost their final six games, finishing last place in the Pacific Division with a 9–41 record.

Second-year forward Maurice Taylor showed improvement, averaging 16.8 points and 5.3 rebounds per game, while Lamond Murray played a sixth man role off the bench, averaging 12.2 points per game. In addition, three-point specialist Eric Piatkowski contributed 10.5 points per game, while Nesby provided the team with 10.1 points and 1.5 steals per game, and Olowokandi averaged 8.9 points and 7.9 rebounds per game, and was named to the NBA All-Rookie Second Team. Douglas contributed 8.2 points and 4.1 assists per game, while Darrick Martin contributed 8.0 points and 3.9 assists per game, Rodney Rogers provided with 7.4 points per game off the bench, and Lorenzen Wright averaged 6.6 points and 7.5 rebounds per game.

Following the season, Murray was traded to the Cleveland Cavaliers, while Rogers signed as a free agent with the Phoenix Suns, Wright was dealt to the Atlanta Hawks, Douglas re-signed with the New Jersey Nets, Martin signed with the Sacramento Kings, and Pooh Richardson was released to free agency.

Draft picks

Roster

Roster Notes
 Point guard Scott Brooks missed the entire season due to a knee injury, and never played for the Clippers.

Regular season

Season standings

z - clinched division title
y - clinched division title
x - clinched playoff spot

Record vs. opponents

Game log

Player statistics

Player Statistics Citation:

Awards and records

Injuries and surgeries

Transactions
The Clippers have been involved in the following transactions during the 1998–1999 season.

Re-signed

Trades
No trades occurred for this team during this season.

Free Agents

Additions

Subtractions

Player Transactions Citation:

See also
 1998-99 NBA season

References

Los Angeles Clippers seasons